The 1908 Army Cadets football team represented the United States Military Academy in the 1908 college football season. In their first season under head coach Harry Nelly, the Cadets compiled a  record, shut out five of their nine opponents (including a scoreless tie with Princeton), and outscored all opponents by a combined total of 87 to 21. The team's only loss was to Yale. In the annual Army–Navy Game, the Cadets defeated the Midshipmen  
 
Two Army players were honored by Walter Camp (WC) on his All-America team. They are center Wallace Philoon (second team) and end Johnson (third team). Philoon also received first-team honors from the Washington Herald, Chicago Inter Ocean, and Fred Crolius. In addition, tackle Daniel Pullen was selected as a first-team All-American by the New York World, Fielding H. Yost, T. A. Dwight Jones, and the Kansas City Journal.

Schedule

References

Army
Army Black Knights football seasons
Army Cadets football